Lobiopa is a genus of sap-feeding beetles in the family Nitidulidae. There are about seven described species in Lobiopa.

Species
These seven species belong to the genus Lobiopa:
 Lobiopa brunnescens (Blatchley, 1917)
 Lobiopa falli Parsons, 1938
 Lobiopa insularis (Laporte, 1840)
 Lobiopa oblonga Parsons, 1938
 Lobiopa punctata Parsons, 1938
 Lobiopa setosa Harold, 1868
 Lobiopa undulata (Say, 1825)

References

Further reading

External links

 

Nitidulidae
Articles created by Qbugbot